The Journal of International Economics is a peer-reviewed academic journal in the field of economics. The journal publishes articles on both theoretical and empirical aspects of international economics. Various topics covered include trade patterns, commercial policy, international institutions, exchange rates, open economy macroeconomics, international finance, and international factor mobility.

Beginning in February 2000 the journal initiated the Bhagwati Award, named in honor of Jagdish Bhagwati. The award is given biannually to the best article appearing in the journal in the preceding two years. The monetary value of the award is $1,000.

According to the Journal Citation Reports, the journal has a 2020 impact factor of 3.373.

References

External links 
 

English-language journals
Bimonthly journals
Publications established in 1971
Elsevier academic journals
Economics journals